Cronauer is the Americanized form of the  German language habitational surname Gronauer, someone from any of several paces called Gronau or a variant of Kronauer.

Notable people with the name include:
 Adrian Cronauer (1938–2018), United States Air Force sergeant and radio personality
 Gail Cronauer (born 1948), American stage, television, and feature film actress

References 

German-language surnames
German toponymic surnames